Vexillum severnsi is a species of sea snail, a marine gastropod mollusk, in the family Costellariidae, the ribbed miters.

References

severnsi
Gastropods described in 2011